Dilli Aaj Tak was a 24-hour Hindi news television channel covering Delhi owned by TV Today Network. It was a sister channel of Aaj Tak. Dilli Aaj Tak initially began as a news bulletin on a public television station in India and turned to an independent channel after the carrier did not renew its contract.

The channel suspended on 30 June 2020 due to financial problems created by COVID-19 lockdown in India.

See also 

 List of television stations in India

References

External links 
 

India Today Group
Television channels and stations established in 2007
Television channels and stations disestablished in 2020